An anime composer is a composer who mainly composes music for anime productions.

There have been many anime composers over the years, and while anime soundtracks are big business in Japan, there have been few notable, long-term composers of anime music before the 2000s.

Notable figures
Joe Hisaishi, best known for his collaboration with Hayao Miyazaki beginning in the mid-1980s.  Since most of Hisaishi's anime music has been for Miyazaki, his influence has been somewhat muted compared to later composers.

Shigeaki Saegusa, composer for Mobile Suit Zeta Gundam in 1985,  was a classical composer who produced a symphonic score for this series, which went on to be extremely popular (one of the foundation successes of the Gundam franchise).  While Saegusa produced only a little more anime music, his Zeta Gundam soundtrack is still considered a classic among otaku.  For many of them, Saegusa and Hisaishi were the first to inspire the idea that anime music could be of very high quality.

Kenji Kawai was producing scores for series such as Blue Seed, Patlabor, and Ranma ½.  While few of these scores were groundbreaking, they were almost all solid works of music.  Kawai was arguably the first composer to produce a number of anime soundtracks and achieve at least a modicum of popularity within the otaku community while doing so.

Yoko Kanno garnered some interest with her soundtracks for Escaflowne and Macross Plus during the 1990s, but it was her soundtrack for Cowboy Bebop in 1998 that made her extremely popular among anime fans.

Hiroyuki Sawano known by his works in famous anime series like Attack on Titan or Aldnoah.Zero, his style is notable by having epic orchestra and vocal songs. He started composing in 2006 and still is composing in soundtracks or in his vocal project SawanoHiroyuki.

Yuki Kajiura is a composer known by her works in anime series such as Sword Art Online, Fate/Zero, Fate/stay night: Heaven's Feel, Demon Slayer: Kimetsu no Yaiba, and Kara no Kyōkai. She is also known for forming the vocal group Kalafina.

Taku Iwasaki (the Rurouni Kenshin OVAs, Witch Hunter Robin, Read or Die TV, Soul Eater) and Yuki Kajiura (Noir, .hack//SIGN, Kara no Kyoukai) have both produced several well-respected soundtracks in the late 1990s and 2000s.

Toshio Masuda (composer), has composed music for anime such as UFO Baby (2000) and Naruto, both of which are popular shows.

Shinji Miyazaki is mainly known writing and arranging music for the anime Pokémon.

Michiru Oshima composed the score for Fullmetal Alchemist. Music for the second series, Fullmetal Alchemist: Brotherhood, was written by the notable composer Akira Senju.

Shiro Sagisu is best known for his collaborations with Gainax. His career has spanned nearly three decades and he's composed for a variety of anime including Kimagure Orange Road, Nadia: The Secret of Blue Water, Neon Genesis Evangelion, and Bleach, as well as Attack on Titan (film)

Yoshihisa Hirano is the acclaimed composer for Death Note'''', Hunter x Hunter (2011), Ouran High School Host Club, Hajime no Ippo, and Midori Days.

Yutaka Yamada, another popular anime composer, known for the scores of Tokyo Ghoul, Vinland Saga, Great Pretender, and Babylon

Satoru Kosaki is another popular composer mainly known writing and arranging music for the anime Lucky Star and The Melancholy of Haruhi Suzumiya.

Goro Omi is another popular composer mainly known writing and arranging science-fiction anime, which is his specialty due to his dark electronic music. He is also best known for the background music in both the Ginga: Nagareboshi Gin and Tonde Buurin TV shows.

Motoyoshi Iwasaki's music style is also dark electronic music, although he is best known for his music from the Hamtaro TV show.

Mark Mancina is more well known for composing background music outside of anime, as well as the music for the Blood+ TV show.

Kohei Tanaka, a prolific anime and video game composer, is famous for being the music composer for One Piece and 21-emon.

Takanori Arisawa, Udi Harpaz, and Amotz Plessner are other popular composers mainly known writing and arranging music for the anime Digimon.

Toshihiko Sahashi is another popular composer mainly known writing and arranging music for the anime Steel Angel Kurumi.

Kow Otani is the music composer for Shakugan no Shana, Blade of the Immortal, Outlaw Star and Deltora Quest.

Shunsuke Kikuchi is the music composer for the Doraemon, Dr. Slump and Arale-chan, Dragon Ball and Dragon Ball Z anime.

Shinkichi Mitsumune, because of his cinematic scoring and orchestration with big Hollywood sound, is the Yu-Gi-Oh! TV show's music composer.

Kevin Penkin, an Australian-born composer known for his scores for Made in Abyss, Rising of the Shield Hero, Tower of God, Eden, and an episode of Star Wars: Visions.

Tsutchie, composer for the new anime adaptation of Gangsta., also composed scores for Cowboy Bebop and Samurai Champloo.

Kan Sawada is another popular composer mainly known writing and arranging music for the anime Doraemon.

Miki Matsubara (1959-2004) was a singer and composer mostly known for her compositions for anime such as Mobile Suit Gundam 0083: Stardust Memory